The 2017 Greater Western Sydney Giants season is the 6th season in the Australian Football League contested by the Greater Western Sydney Giants.

2017 season squad

Season summary

Pre-season

Home and Away Season

Finals

Ladder

References

Greater Western Sydney Giants seasons
Greater Western Sydney